Eyes On The Prize is an album by New Zealand group, 3 The Hard Way released in 2003. It charted at number 14 in November, 2003.

Track listing
Higher Than High (Intro)
Eyes On The Prize
It's On (Move to This)
Girls
Talk Is Cheap
Everyday (Part 2)
The RPMs
Burn Rubber
Nothing's Changed
Rolling
Warm Up
Hate Me Now
Party People
Beautiful Day
Higher Than High

3 the Hard Way albums
2003 albums